Permutation is the tenth solo album by American composer Bill Laswell, released on November 30, 1999 by ION Records.

Track listing

Personnel 
Adapted from the Permutation liner notes.
Musicians
Hassan Ibn Ali – sampler
Lance Carter – drums
Helios Creed – sampler
Bill Laswell – bass guitar, guitar, keyboards, effects, drum programming, musical arrangements, producer
Nicky Skopelitis – guitar
Technical personnel
Michael Fossenkemper – mastering
Robert Musso – engineering, programming

Release history

References

External links 
 Permutation at Bandcamp
 

1999 albums
Bill Laswell albums
Albums produced by Bill Laswell